Ballon may refer to:

Places
Ballon, County Carlow (Balana in Irish), a village in Ireland
Grand Ballon, the apex of the Vosges Mountains in France
Ballon, Charente-Maritime, France
Ballon, Sarthe, France

Others
Ballon (ballet), the appearance of being lightweight and light-footed while jumping
Ballon (surname)

See also
Balloon (disambiguation)
Balon (disambiguation)